The West Indian cricket team toured England in September 2011. The tour consisted of two Twenty20 matches. The fixtures in London were organised by the ECB, to fulfill contractual agreements with the WICB and the media.

Squads

T20I series

1st T20I

2nd T20I

References

2011-12
West Indies
International cricket competitions in 2011
2011 in cricket